KTST (101.9 FM, "101.9 The Twister") is a country music station serving the Oklahoma City area and is owned by iHeartMedia, Inc. Its transmitter is located in Northeast Oklahoma City, Oklahoma, and studios are located at the 50 Penn Place building on the Northwest side.

History
The station went on the air with a MOR format as KFNB (K First National Bank) transmitting from their bank building top downtown in 1962. The station switched calls to KLTE and became adult contemporary "Lite Rock 102" in 1979.  Although it was, for a time, the only AC station in OKC, Lite Rock 102 struggled to catch on.  After KOFM 104.1 shocked the market and abandoned its successful CHR format for AC as Magic 104, Lite Rock 102 would usually be the lowest rated Class C FM in the market.  Lite Rock 102 tried several different experiments to boost ratings, including jazz in the afterhours and oldies on the weekends, but none brought it much success.

The station switched formats to oldies and became "K-Lite 102" in August 1989. On January 2, 1991 at 9:00 PM during Jamie Lee's airshift, the station announced it was changing call letters to KOQL and would become known as "Kool 102". The oldies format was fairly successful, but Entercom announced just before Thanksgiving 1993 that KOQL would be the first station it would sell in roughly 20 years.  Newmarket Communications, owner of country KXXY 1340/96.1, would purchase the station and begin operating it immediately in an LMA.  The future was easy to predict as Newmarket had just acquired a second station with the same format in New Orleans to pair with its country WNOE 101.1 and flipped it to a second country station.  By Christmas 1993, KOQL would be the home of "Non-stop, full tilt rockin' country," 101.9 The Twister.  The call letters changed to KTST on March 11, 1994 when the FCC approved of the license transfer from Entercom to Newmarket.

Newmarket announced it would be selling to Radio Equity Partners shortly after taking over The Twister, and Radio Equity Partners became one of the first major Clear Channel acquisitions after the Telecommunications Act of 1996 passed.  The result was a bigger cluster at 50 Penn Place, including KTOK 1000, KXXY 1340/96.1, KJYO 102.7, KEBC 94.7 and KTST 101.9.  For a brief time, Clear Channel also operated Gaylord's WKY 930 alongside its OKC cluster.

KTST, along with the other iHeart stations in Oklahoma City, simulcasts audio of KFOR-TV if a tornado warning is issued within the Oklahoma City metro area.

DJs
The Bobby Bones Show - Morning Show Host (Bobby Bones)
Buff - Afternoon Host (Craig Buffington from sister station KJ103)
Michaet Tait - night Show Host (Original DJ from Twister since 1994 also from KOCC 88.9)
After Midnight with Cody Alan - Overnights from 12am to 5am
John Shaw - Saturdays from 10am to 2pm and Sundays from 11am to 2pm (also serves as Promotion Director for IheartMediaOKC)

Notable former airstaff
Beth Myers - News on KTOK and ONN. Known as Jamie Lee on KOQL.

Steve English - Afternoons on Lite Rock 102. Worked for KTNT 97.7/97.9 during its jazz and smooth

Jack Elliott and Ron Williams - Morning show on K-Lite 102 and KOOL 102. Went to KYIS 98.9 after KOQL became The Twister. Now on podcast. Jack Elliott works with KOKC.

Terry Mason - Longtime Omaha jock at KOIL. Served as PD of the oldies format before moving to Orlando, FL.

Jon Brent - Took over as PD after Terry Mason left and hosted afternoon show. Last PD of the oldies format. Previously worked in San Francisco, Austin and Charlotte. Went on to work at KHYL in Sacramento and became a TV news anchor at stations in Texas and California after KHYL switched to Jammin' Oldies.

Scott Thrower - Longtime radio personality who also worked at KBIG/Los Angeles, WEGX/Philadelphia and KKRZ/Portland. Now out of radio, working in Little Rock as a Registered Nurse.

Joe Friday - Brand Manager for 99.7 Hank FM.

Big Jake - Production Director for 99.7 Hank FM/1640 The Eagle. Work Day on Hank.

External links
KTST station website

TST
Country radio stations in the United States
Radio stations established in 1962
IHeartMedia radio stations